Stormovik: SU-25 Soviet Attack Fighter is a 1990 video game published by Electronic Arts.

Gameplay
Stormovik: SU-25 Soviet Attack Fighter is a game in which dissidents from the upper ranks of national defense industries destabilize relations between East and West using terrorism.

Reception
Stanley R. Trevena reviewed the game for Computer Gaming World, and stated that "Deficiencies aside, this writer found it strangely appealing to roam the skies over Germany, hunting down and destroying both NATO and Warsaw Pact hardware."

Reviews
ACE (Advanced Computer Entertainment) - Oct, 1990
PC Leisure - Nov, 1990
ASM (Aktueller Software Markt) - Nov, 1990
Computer Gaming World - Jun, 1991

References

External links
Review in Compute!

1990 video games
Cold War video games
Combat flight simulators
DOS games
DOS-only games
Electronic Arts games
Video games developed in the United States
Video games set in East Germany
Video games set in the 1990s
Video games set in the Soviet Union